The Ciskei Defence Force (CDF) was established during March 1981 from the 141 Battalion of the South African Defence Force (SADF). It was the defence force of Ciskei, a bantustan that was controlled by the apartheid regime of South Africa. The CDF functioned as part of the 21 Battalion based near Lenasia, outside Johannesburg.

Overview
In 1993 the total troop count of the CDF was 2000. The defence expenditure for Ciskei for 1991/2 was R76,883,000 and for the period of 1993/94 it was R99,910,000.

Organisation and structure
According to Jakkie Cilliers, the CDF consisted of the following:

Defence Headquarters
Originally located at Jong'umsobomvu (outside King William's Town), however, in 1993 the CDF's headquarters moved to the Parliament Buildings in Bhisho. Jong'umsobomvu retained the following:

 Logistic Depot: including general equipment, uniforms, daily maintenance, rations, fuel, etc.
 Maintenance and Construction Unit
 Training Centre.

One Ciskei Battalion
The battalion consisted of 900 men and were stationed at Bhisho; it consisted of:
3 companies of which 2 had Mamba mine-protected vehicles
a small support company
a large Light Workshop Troop and signals workshops which served the whole of the CDF

Two Ciskei Battalion
The battalion consisted of 700 men and was stationed at Keiskammahoek; it consisted of:
3 companies with Mamba mine-protected vehicles
a small support company.

Air Wing
Situated at Bisho Airport a.k.a. Bulembu; it consisted of:
two Shorts Skyvan light transport aircraft for paratroopers and general air transport
three MBB/Kawasaki BK 117 helicopters
three light fixed wing aircraft for communication flights, etc. (Cessna 150)
two Britten-Norman Islanders for personnel and freight transport
Piper Cub

There was a special forces/parachute company stationed at Bulembu, the core of a possible future parachute regiment.
The Ciskei military band was also stationed at Bulembo and fell under the Air Wing for administrative purposes.

Auxiliary
The CDF's auxiliary according to Jakkie Cilliers  consisted of, quote:

"The CDF had semi-permanent company bases at Alice and Kama/Whittlesea.
There are also Auxiliary Services for which the CDF provided training and certain administrative functions. These Services are tasked with the protection of chiefs and headmen. These forces are controlled by structures within the Council of State. There is also a decentralised medical and signals element.

Ranks
Officers

Other

Equipment
The CDF was equipped for counter-insurgency (COIN) operations. The CDF had one 25 pounder field gun for ceremonial purposes and used R4/R5 assault rifles. The 7,62 mm Light Machine Gun issued was the SS-77. Other armaments included the 40 mm Multiple Grenade Launcher, 60 mm and 81 mm mortars and 7,62 mm Browning.

Vehicles included Mambas, Buffels, Samil 20, seven ton Isuzu trucks and 4x4 vehicles."

Insignia

Medals
There were two medals awarded for service to the members of the CDF namely:
 Independence Medal (Ciskei), introduced in 1981
 Ciskei Defence Medal, introduced in 1988

Disbandment
With the end of Apartheid in 1994 in South Africa, the former defence forces of the Bantustans were incorporated into the newly formed South African National Defence Force.

Flag
The Flag of Ciskei was located in the canton on a green background. On the green a large golden eagle clasped a lightning bolt.

References

Further reading
Gavin Cawthra and Martin Navias: The Ciskei Defence Force. Jane's Intelligence Review, February 1993, 94-96.

Apartheid government
Organisations associated with apartheid
Defunct organisations based in South Africa
Disbanded armed forces
Military units and formations established in 1981
Military units and formations of the Cold War
Military units and formations of South Africa
Ciskei
Military decorations and medals of Ciskei
Military units and formations disestablished in 1994